In mathematics, a Boolean matrix is a matrix with entries from a Boolean algebra. When the two-element Boolean algebra is used, the Boolean matrix is called a logical matrix.  (In some contexts, particularly computer science, the term "Boolean matrix" implies this restriction.)  

Let U be a non-trivial Boolean algebra (i.e. with at least two elements). Intersection, union, complementation, and containment of elements is expressed in U. Let V be the collection of n × n matrices that have entries taken from U. Complementation of such a matrix is obtained by complementing each element. The intersection or union of two such matrices is obtained by applying the operation to entries of each pair of elements to obtain the corresponding matrix intersection or union. A matrix is contained in another if each entry of the first is contained in the corresponding entry of the second.

The product of two Boolean matrices is expressed as follows:

According to one author, "Matrices over an arbitrary Boolean algebra β satisfy most of the properties over β0 = {0, 1}.

References

 R. Duncan Luce (1952) "A Note on Boolean Matrices", Proceedings of the American Mathematical Society 3: 382–8, Jstor link 
 Jacques Riguet (1954) "Sur l'extension du calcul des relations binaires au calcul des matrices à éléments dans une algèbre de Boole", Comptes Rendus 238: 2382–2385

Further reading
 Stan Gudder & Frédéric Latrémolière (2009) "Boolean inner-product spaces and Boolean matrices", Linear Algebra and Its Applications 431: 274–96 
 D.E. Rutherford (1963) "Inverses of Boolean matrices", Proceedings of the Glasgow Mathematical Association 6: 49–63 
 T.S. Blythe (1967) "Eigenvectors of Boolean Matrices", Proceedings of the Royal Society of Edinburgh 67: 196–204 
 Steven Kirkland & Norman J. Pullman (1993) "Linear Operators Preserving Invariants of Non-binary Boolean Matrices", Linear and Multilinear Algebra 33: 295–300  
 Kyung-Kae Kang, Seok-Zun Song & Young-Bae Jung (2011) "Linear Preservers of Regular Matrices over General Boolean Algebras", Bulletin of the Malaysian Mathematical Sciences Society, second series, 34(1): 113–25 

Matrices
Boolean algebra